Come All Ye Faithless is the third and final studio album by post-punk band Death of Samantha, released in 1989 on Homestead Records.

Release and reception 

AllMusic critic Fred Beldin felt that it was an excellent record, writing: "Vocalist John Petkovic has an idiosyncratic snarl that might take getting used to, but once overcome the literary bent of the lyrics emerges and his sneer becomes part of the poetry. Doug Gillard pours out fluid lead guitar melodies that can break into atonal skronk at will without jarring the listener, and the rhythm section of Dave Swanson and Steve-O is tight but loose enough to swing in and out of the beat." He gave it 4.5 out of 5 stars, concluding that "Cobra Verde and Guided By Voices fans owe it to themselves to track down the records of this seminal band." Glenn Kenny of Trouser Press said that while Come All Ye Faithless is noticeably darker and lacks the exuberance of its predecessor, it "presents a terrific set of songs with which to crawl into a dark corner"

Track listing

Personnel 
Adapted from the Come All Ye Faithless liner notes.

Death of Samantha
Doug Gillard – guitar, melodica, organ, percussion, piano, vocals
John Petkovic – vocals, guitar, clarinet, percussion
Steve-O – drums, percussion, vocals
Dave Swanson – bass guitar, drums, percussion, guitar, vocals

Additional musicians and production
Chris Burgess – production
Carolyn Cull – voices
Alan McGinty – production
Scott Savidge – saxophone
Chedomir Stanisic – cello
Rudolph Vasalino – illustrations, design
Jim Wilson – piano, organ

Release history

External links

References 

1989 albums
Death of Samantha albums
Homestead Records albums